Gay Vegas, is an American LGBT interest magazine, printed monthly and available for free. The Gay Vegas brand also includes GayVegas.com, the website. Both magazine and website have an editorial focus on Las Vegas news, politics, opinion, and arts and entertainment of interest to lesbians, gay men, bisexuals, transgender, queer, intersex, asexual and plus (LGBT) people.

References

External links
 Official magazine website

1997 establishments in Nevada
LGBT-related magazines published in the United States
Local interest magazines published in the United States
Monthly magazines published in the United States
Free magazines
Magazines established in 1997
Magazines published in Nevada
Mass media in Las Vegas